Georgi Todorov (born 19 February 1949) is a Bulgarian gymnast. He competed in eight events at the 1976 Summer Olympics.

References

1949 births
Living people
Bulgarian male artistic gymnasts
Olympic gymnasts of Bulgaria
Gymnasts at the 1976 Summer Olympics
Place of birth missing (living people)